West Fulton Methodist Church is a historic Methodist church located in Fulton, Schoharie County, New York.  It was built in 1906, and is a two-story, rectangular, Late Victorian style frame church.  It has a broad front gable roof and sits on a limestone foundation.  The front facade features an asymmetrically placed multi-stage bell tower.  The interior is based on the Akron plan.

It was listed on the National Register of Historic Places in 2013.

References

Akron Plan church buildings
Methodist churches in New York (state)
Churches on the National Register of Historic Places in New York (state)
Victorian architecture in New York (state)
Churches completed in 1906
Churches in Schoharie County, New York
National Register of Historic Places in Schoharie County, New York
1906 establishments in New York (state)